Fararu is a private news agency in Iran. Its purpose is to improve the free dissemination of information and enhance the national interests of Iran. 
It is ranked among the top 100 websites in Iran.

References

External links

News agencies based in Iran
Mass media in Tehran